Valentin Vladimirovich Yegunov (born 23 April 1976) is a former Russian professional footballer.

Club career
He made his debut in the Russian Premier League in 1996 for FC Zenit St. Petersburg.

Honours
 Russian Second Division, Zone East top scorer: 2009 (15 goals), 2010 (19 goals).
 Russian Second Division, Zone East best player and best striker: 2009, 2010.

References

1976 births
Living people
Russian footballers
Russia youth international footballers
FC Zenit Saint Petersburg players
FC Tyumen players
FC Moscow players
FC Shinnik Yaroslavl players
FC Dynamo Barnaul players
Russian Premier League players
Association football forwards
FC Novokuznetsk players
FC Sever Murmansk players
FC Zenit-2 Saint Petersburg players
Sportspeople from Rostov Oblast